Christie Park can have the following meanings:
Christie Park (Sydney, Australia), a sports ground in the Lower North Shore, Sydney, Australia
Christie Park, Calgary, a neighbourhood in Calgary, Alberta, Canada
Christie Park, Huntly, a football stadium in Huntly, Aberdeenshire, Scotland
Christie Park (Morecambe), a stadium in Morecambe, Lancashire, England